Lynn is a town in Washington Township, Randolph County, in the U.S. state of Indiana. The population was 1,097 at the 2010 census.

History
A post office was established at Lynn in 1838. The town plat was recorded in 1850.

Geography
Lynn is located at  (40.047590, -84.942173).

Demographics

2010 census
As of the census of 2010, there were 1,097 people, 439 households, and 302 families living in the town. The racial makeup of the town was 97.7% White, 0.5% African American, 0.1% Native American, 0.7% Asian, 0.2% from other races, and 0.8% from two or more races. Hispanic or Latino of any race were 1.9% of the population.

There were 439 households, of which 35.1% had children under the age of 18 living with them, 49.0% were married couples living together, 13.4% had a female householder with no husband present, 6.4% had a male householder with no wife present, and 31.2% were non-families. 26.2% of all households were made up of individuals, and 14.8% had someone living alone who was 65 years of age or older. The average household size was 2.50 and the average family size was 2.97.

The median age in the town was 37.9 years. 25.7% of residents were under the age of 18; 8.7% were between the ages of 18 and 24; 24.6% were from 25 to 44; 23% were from 45 to 64; and 17.9% were 65 years of age or older. The gender makeup of the town was 48.3% male and 51.7% female.

2000 census
As of the census of 2000, there were 1,143 people, 468 households, and 313 families living in the town. The racial makeup of the town was 96.50% White, 0.35% African American, 0.17% Native American, 0.44% Asian, 0.35% Pacific Islander, 0.26% from other races, and 1.92% from two or more races. Hispanic or Latino of any race were 0.44% of the population.

There were 468 households, out of which 32.1% had children under the age of 18 living with them, 53.2% were married couples living together, 9.4% had a female householder with no husband present, and 33.1% were non-families. 28.6% of all households were made up of individuals, and 14.7% had someone living alone who was 65 years of age or older. The average household size was 2.44 and the average family size was 2.99.

In the town, the population was spread out, with 26.3% under the age of 18, 9.2% from 18 to 24, 26.5% from 25 to 44, 22.4% from 45 to 64, and 15.6% who were 65 years of age or older. The median age was 36 years. For every 100 females, there were 92.4 males. For every 100 females age 18 and over, there were 91.4 males.

The median income for a household in the town was $32,368, and the median income for a family was $38,636. Males had a median income of $27,917 versus $20,438 for females. The per capita income for the town was $15,148. About 7.9% of families and 10.2% of the population were below the poverty line, including 11.1% of those under age 18 and 12.3% of those age 65 or over.

Education
The town has a lending library, the Lynn-Washington Township Public Library.

Notable person
Jim Jones grew up in the area. He would later lead the Peoples Temple cult murder at Jonestown.

References

Towns in Randolph County, Indiana
Towns in Indiana